2013 World Ice Hockey Championships may refer to:

 2013 Men's World Ice Hockey Championships
 2013 IIHF Women's World Championship
 2013 World Junior Ice Hockey Championships
 2013 IIHF World U18 Championships